In classical mechanics, impulse (symbolized by  or Imp) is the integral of a force, over the time interval, for which it acts. Since force is a vector quantity, impulse is also a vector quantity. Impulse applied to an object produces an equivalent vector change in its linear momentum, also in the resultant direction. The SI unit of impulse is the newton second (N⋅s), and the dimensionally equivalent unit of momentum is the kilogram meter per second (kg⋅m/s). The corresponding English engineering unit is the pound-second (lbf⋅s), and in the British Gravitational System, the unit is the slug-foot per second (slug⋅ft/s).

A resultant force causes acceleration and a change in the velocity of the body for as long as it acts. A resultant force applied over a longer time, therefore, produces a bigger change in linear momentum than the same force applied briefly: the change in momentum is equal to the product of the average force and duration. Conversely, a small force applied for a long time produces the same change in momentum—the same impulse—as a larger force applied briefly.

The impulse is the integral of the resultant force with respect to time:

Mathematical derivation in the case of an object of constant mass

From Newton's second law, force is related to momentum  by

Therefore,

This is often called the impulse-momentum theorem (analogous to the work-energy theorem).

As a result, an impulse may also be regarded as the change in momentum of an object to which a resultant force is applied. The impulse may be expressed in a simpler form when the mass is constant:

where
 is the resultant force applied,
 is the mass of the object,
 is the final velocity of the object at the end of the time interval, and
 is the initial velocity of the object when the time interval begins.

Impulse has the same units and dimensions  as momentum.

The term "impulse" is also used to refer to a fast-acting force or impact. This type of impulse is often idealized so that the change in momentum produced by the force happens with no change in time. This sort of change is a step change, and is not physically possible. However, this is a useful model for computing the effects of ideal collisions (such as in game physics engines).  Additionally, in rocketry, the term "total impulse" is commonly used and is considered synonymous with the term "impulse".

Variable mass

The application of Newton's second law for variable mass allows impulse and momentum to be used as analysis tools for jet- or rocket-propelled vehicles. In the case of rockets, the impulse imparted can be normalized by unit of propellant expended, to create a performance parameter, specific impulse. This fact can be used to derive the Tsiolkovsky rocket equation, which relates the vehicle's propulsive change in velocity to the engine's specific impulse (or nozzle exhaust velocity) and the vehicle's propellant-mass ratio.

See also
Wave–particle duality defines the impulse of a wave collision. The preservation of momentum in the collision is then called phase matching. Applications include:
Compton effect
Nonlinear optics
Acousto-optic modulator
Electron phonon scattering

 Dirac delta function, mathematical abstraction of a pure impulse
 One-way wave equation

Notes

Bibliography

External links
 Dynamics

Classical mechanics
Vector physical quantities

de:Impuls#Kraftstoß